Shatra may refer to:

 Paljor Dorje Shatra, a Tibetan politician.
 Shatra (game), a chess like game from the Altai region of Siberia
 Shatra (rattle), a rattle used in Altai music
 An alternate name for Ash Shatrah, a town in the Tigris-Euphrates delta of Iraq
 Shatra FC, an Iraqi football club
 Shatrovo, Bulgaria, known in Aromanian as